Bryan Boulaye Kevin Dabo (born 18 February 1992) is a professional footballer who plays as a midfielder for Super League Greece club Aris. Born in France, he represents the Burkina Faso national team.

Club career

Montpellier
Dabo made his professional debut with Montpellier on 16 May 2010 in a 3–1 win against Paris Saint-Germain coming on as an 84th-minute substitute for Geoffrey Dernis. He made his first start against Bastia.

Blackburn Rovers (loan)
On 28 January 2014, Dabo signed for Championship club Blackburn Rovers on loan with an option of a permanent deal. He was an unused substitute in a 2–0 win against Blackpool. He played the full 90 minutes for Blackburn Rovers U21 against Tottenham U21.

Saint-Étienne
In June 2016, Dabo joined Montpellier's league rivals AS Saint-Étienne on a four-year contract.

Fiorentina
On 30 January 2018, he joined Fiorentina, signing a three-and-a-half year contract. He scored his first Serie A goal in a 3–2 away win against Genoa, netting the winner. His second goal came in the 2018/2019 season, in a 3–1 victory in the derby against Empoli.

Loan to SPAL
On 13 January 2020, he joined SPAL on loan with an option to purchase.

Benevento
In September 2020, Dabo joined newly promoted side Benevento on a permanent deal. He signed a 2-year deal with the Stregoni.

Çaykur Rizespor
On 19 July 2021, he signed a three-year contract with an additional one-year option with Turkish club Çaykur Rizespor.

Aris
On 5 July 2022, Dabo joined Aris on a two-year deal.

International career
Dabo was born in France to a Burkinabé father and a Malian mother. He represented the France national under-21 football team once, in a friendly in 2013. He was called up to the Burkina Faso national football team, and the Mali national football team in 2016. He made his debut for Burkina Faso on 22 March 2018.

Personal life
On 21 November 2020 he tested positive for COVID-19.

Career statistics

Club
.

International goals
Scores and results list Burkina Faso's goal tally first.

References

External links
 
 
 
 
 

1992 births
Living people
Footballers from Marseille
Citizens of Burkina Faso through descent
Burkinabé footballers
Burkina Faso international footballers
Burkinabé people of Malian descent
Sportspeople of Malian descent
French footballers
France youth international footballers
France under-21 international footballers
French sportspeople of Burkinabé descent
Sportspeople of Burkinabé descent
French sportspeople of Malian descent
Association football midfielders
Ligue 1 players
Serie A players
Montpellier HSC players
Blackburn Rovers F.C. players
AS Saint-Étienne players
ACF Fiorentina players
S.P.A.L. players
Benevento Calcio players
Çaykur Rizespor footballers
Super League Greece players
Aris Thessaloniki F.C. players
Burkinabé expatriate footballers
French expatriate footballers
Expatriate footballers in England
Expatriate footballers in Italy
Expatriate footballers in Turkey
Expatriate footballers in Greece
21st-century Burkinabé people
Black French sportspeople
Burkinabé expatriate sportspeople in Italy
Burkinabé expatriate sportspeople in England
Burkinabé expatriate sportspeople in Greece
Burkinabé expatriate sportspeople in Turkey
French expatriate sportspeople in Italy
French expatriate sportspeople in England
French expatriate sportspeople in Greece
French expatriate sportspeople in Turkey